Gunsight Lake is an alpine lake in Custer County, Idaho, United States, located in the White Cloud Mountains in the Sawtooth National Recreation Area.  No trails lead to lake but it can be accessed from Sawtooth National Forest trail 680.

Gunsight Lake is just southeast of the Chinese Wall and in the same basin as Dike, Quartzite, and Tin Cup Lakes.

See also
 List of lakes of the White Cloud Mountains
 Sawtooth National Recreation Area
 White Cloud Mountains

References

Lakes of Idaho
Lakes of Custer County, Idaho
Glacial lakes of the United States
Glacial lakes of the Sawtooth National Forest